Chimaphila umbellata, the umbellate wintergreen, pipsissewa, or prince's pine, is a small perennial flowering plant found in dry woodlands, or sandy soils. It is native throughout the cool temperate Northern Hemisphere.

It grows 10–35 cm tall, and has evergreen shiny, bright green, toothed leaves arranged in opposite pairs or whorls of 3–4 along the stem. Leaves have a shallowly toothed margin, where the teeth have fine hairs at their ends. The flowers are white or pink, produced in a small umbel of 4–8 together.

Ecology 

Although it has green leaves year-round, it receives a significant portion of its nutrition from fungi in the soil (that is, it is a partial myco-heterotroph, which is not surprising as related plants, such as Pyrola, are partial or full myco-heterotrophs).

Taxonomy 

There are four subspecies:
Chimaphila umbellata subsp. umbellata – Europe, Asia
Chimaphila umbellata subsp. acuta – southwestern North America
Chimaphila umbellata subsp. cisatlantica – northeastern North America
Chimaphila umbellata subsp. occidentalis – northwestern North America

Uses

Some Plateau Indian tribes used a boil of prince's pine to treat tuberculosis.

The twentieth century Appalachian folk healer Clarence "Catfish" Gray, "Man of the Woods", credited pipsissewa with curing his own heart problems and included it in his 15 herb cure-all "bitters."

It is used as a flavoring in candy and soft drinks, particularly root beer.

The roots and leaves of Chimaphila umbellata can be boiled to create tea.

Recent investigations show the anti-proliferative effect of Chimaphila umbellata in human breast cancer cells (MCF-7).

Name
"Pipsissewa" is a Cree name meaning "It-breaks-into-small-pieces".

References

External links
Flora Europaea: Chimaphila umbellata distribution
linnaeus.nrm.se: range map with the different subspecies of the Chimaphila umbellata-complex
 Jepson Manual treatment – Chimaphila umbellata
USDA Plants Profile: Chimaphila umbellata

umbellata
Flora of North America
Flora of Europe
Flora of temperate Asia
Plants used in traditional Native American medicine
Medicinal plants of Asia
Medicinal plants of Europe
Plants described in 1753
Rhizomatous plants
Stoloniferous plants
Taxa named by Carl Linnaeus